Shadja is the first svara out of the seven svaras of Hindustani music and Carnatic music. Shadja is the long form of the syllable सा. For simplicity in pronouncing while singing the syllable, Shadja is pronounced as Sa (notation - S). It is also called as षड्ज in the Devanagri script.

Details
The following is the information about Shadja and its importance in Indian classical music :

 Shadja is the first svara in an octave or Saptak.
 Shadja is also the first and the main svara in a raga. (Not always but mostly it is. )
 The svara that is played on the Tanpura for the singer is Shadja. It is played to know that one is singing on the right pitch and octave.
 Shadja is the base or basic svara. It is a very fundamental svara in Classical music.
 It is fascinating to know that after one raga is sung or played, and when one more raga is to be performed, then the svara Sa is played so that there is no confusion in mixing of svaras in both the ragas that are performed. (Specifically in ragas of the same svaras but different Chalan or movement.)
 It is said that Shadja is the basic svara from which all the other 6 svaras are produced. When we break the word Shadja then we get, Shad And Ja. It means that Shad is 6 and ja is 'giving birth' in Marathi. So basically the translation is :
  षड् - 6, ज -जन्म . Therefore, it collectively means giving birth to the other 6 notes of the music.

 The frequency of Shadja is 240 Hz. The frequencies of the seven svaras are also given below: Sa 240 Hz, Re 270 Hz, Ga 300 Hz, Ma 320 Hz, Pa 360 Hz, Dha 400 Hz, and Ni 450 Hz, Sa 480 Hz (Taar Saptak) ........ (and so on).
Consequently, the Sa after the Ni of 450 Hz has a frequency of 480 Hz i.e. the double of the Lower octave Sa.

 There are four Shruti's of Sadja. Previously the main Shruti not only for Sa but for all the other svaras was on the last Shruti but now it is considered to be on the first Shruti.
For example, if these are the four Shruti's of Sa then,

                       Previously this was the position of the main Shruti of Sa.
                        ^ 
              1   2  3  4
              ^
              But now this position has become the main Shruti of Sa.

 All the other svaras except Shadja (Sa) and Pancham (Pa) can be  or  svaras but Sa and Pa are always Shuddha svaras. And hence svaras Sa and Pa are called Achal Svaras , since these svaras don't move from their original position. Svaras Ra, Ga, Ma, Dha, Ni are called Chal Svaras, since these svaras move from their original position.
    
     Sa, Re, Ga, Ma, Pa, Dha, Ni - Shuddha Svaras
    
     Re, Ga, Dha, Ni -  
   
     Ma - 

 It will be fascinating for you to know that Sa is the only svara which cannot be omitted in a particular raga. So Sa can't be Varjit in any of the ragas. Hence Sa is the most important svara in the Saptak or in any Raga.
 For some ragas where Sa is the Vadi or Samvadi svara, Sa is played repeatedly. But for ragas where Sa is not a Vadi or a Samvadi svara, it is still played repeatedly since it the main svara.
 Ragas where Sa is the Vadi svara - Raga Malkauns, etc. Ragas where Sa is the Samvadi svara - Raga Kedar.
 Hypothetically speaking, Shadja is said to be the Sakar Bhrama , Sakar Bhrama as in the three main gods, Bhrama, Vishnu and Shiva. Sa is made the acronym of Sakar for showing the importance of the syllable Sa.
 Shadja is said to be sourced from the cry of a peacock.
 Shadja is associated with the planet Mercury.
 Shadja is associated with Green colour.

See also
 List of Ragas in Hindustani classical music
 Svara
 Rishabh (Re)
 Gandhar (Ga)
 Madhyam (Ma)
 Pancham (Pa)
 Dhaivat (Dha)
 Nishad (Ni)

 Sa (svara)
 Shadja (Sa)

References

Hindustani music
Carnatic music